The 2000 French Figure Skating Championships took place between 9 and 12 December 1999 in Courchevel. Skaters competed at the senior level in the disciplines of men's singles, women's singles, pair skating, and ice dancing. The event was used to help determine the French team to the 2000 World Championships and the 2000 European Championships.

Results

Men

Ladies

Pairs

Ice dancing

External links
 results

1999 in figure skating
French Figure Skating Championships, 2000
French Figure Skating Championships
2000 in French sport